José Alberto Rozo Gutiérrez, S.M.M. (22 February 1937 – 24 May 2018) was a Roman Catholic bishop.

Rozo Gutiérrez was born in Colombia and was ordained to the priesthood in 1962. He served as Vicar Apostolic of the Apostolic Vicariate of Puerto Gaitán, Colombia, as a Titular Bishop of Arsennaria, from 1999 to 2012.

Notes

1937 births
2018 deaths
21st-century Roman Catholic bishops in Colombia
Roman Catholic bishops of Puerto Gaitán